Mühren is a surname. Notable people with the surname include:
 Arnold Mühren (born 1951), Dutch football manager and former footballer
 Bianca de Jong-Muhren (born 1986), Dutch chess grandmaster
 Gerrie Mühren (1946–2013), Dutch footballer
 Robert Mühren (born 1989), Dutch footballer